Events in the year 2021 in the State of Palestine.

Incumbents
State of Palestine (UN observer non-member State)

President (PLO): Mahmoud Abbas
Prime Minister: Mohammad Shtayyeh

Events
Ongoing — COVID-19 pandemic in the State of Palestine
 4 February - Israel razed Khirbet Humsa al-Fawqa for the second time because of what it claimed was an illegal settlement next to a military firing range. The Israeli rights group B'Tselem called the demolition "unusually broad," accusing Israel of seeking "to forcibly transfer Palestinian communities in order to take over their land."
 23 April - More than 100 people are injured after clashes in East Jerusalem.
 27 April - Palestinian National Authority President Mahmoud Abbas decided to postpone the 2021 Palestinian parliamentary elections.
 6 May 
 Dozens of Israeli settlers attacked a Palestinian village in West Bank in response to the drive-by shooting of three Israelis days prior.
  Multiple Palestinian factions including members from Hamas rejected President Mahmoud Abbas' decision to postpone the 2021 Palestinian parliamentary elections.
 7 May - At least 200 Palestinians and 6 Israeli police officers are injured following clashes in the Al-Aqsa Mosque compound after reports of Israel's intention to evict Palestinians from land claimed by Jewish settlers.
 8 May - Second night of clashes in Al-Aqsa Mosque injures 100 Palestinians.
 9 May 
 Clashes intensify after protests spread across major cities in Israel and Palestinian territories.
 Israeli forces storm Al-Aqsa mosque, injuring more than 300 Palestinians.
 10 May 
 Hamas launches more than 100 rockets into Jerusalem in retaliation to the storming of Al-Aqsa by Israeli forces a day prior.
 IDF launches missile attack on Gaza Strip, killing 20 people including 9 children.
 11 May 
 Hamas launches another 130 barrage of rockets to Israel.
 A total of 28 Palestinians have been killed since the start of the worsening crisis between Palestine and Israel.
 7 July - Khirbet Humsa al-Fawqa was demolished by Israel again for at least the third time.
 6 September - Six Palestinian prisoners escape from Gilboa Prison, a maximum security prison in northern Israel.
 10 September - Palestinians hold rallies across West Bank following calls from Hamas and other Palestinian factions to hold "day of rage" in solidarity with the escaped Gilboa prisoners.
 20 October - A Palestinian woman is held in detention and prevented from breastfeeding her baby by Israeli police officers.
11 December - 2021 Palestinian local elections
23 December - Some 125 Palestinian civilians sustained light to moderate injuries during clashes with the Israeli occupation forces, which erupted shortly after hundreds of Israeli settlers protected by army attempted to break into and attack the village of Burqa, according to medical sources. The Palestinian Red Crescent (PRC) told that 42 Palestinians, including a journalist, were injured after being hit with rubber-coated steel rounds, while another 83 sustained suffocation from inhalation of teargas fired by the Israeli army. PRC added that a girl was treated for shock after a group of violent Israeli settlers attacked her family’s home on the outskirts of the village.

Deaths
 

1 February – Abd al-Sattar Qasim, writer (born 1948).
2 February – Naim Attallah, Palestinian-born British book publisher (born 1931).
14 February – Mourid Barghouti, poet and writer (born 1944).
5 May - Izz al-Din Manasirah, poet, critic, intellectual and academic (born 1946). 
17 July - Mohammed Milhim, politician (born 1929).

See also 
Timeline of the Israeli–Palestinian conflict in 2021

References

 
2020s in the State of Palestine
Years of the 21st century in the State of Palestine
Palestine
Palestine